The Centre for Health Protection is an agency under the Department of Health in Hong Kong responsible for disease prevention and control. CHP plays the same role and function as the Centers for Disease Control in the United States, and the European Centre for Disease Prevention and Control in the European Union (EU).

History
Hong Kong was severely affected by the 2003 outbreak of the severe acute respiratory syndrome (SARS), with 299 people killed by the disease. The health system's performance in the face of the epidemic was scrutinised, and there were calls for an independent investigation. On 14 May 2003, Michael Mak, representative of the Health Services constituency, initiated a non-binding motion within the Legislative Council's health services panel  calling for the setting-up of a select committee to investigate government officials and Hospital Authority executives. Mak commented that the SARS outbreak had uncovered "administrative and policy weaknesses", and stated, "I hope that when a similar outbreak happens in the future, we will not find ourselves in such a mess again." The motion passed unanimously, as all but one of the pro-government legislators had walked out, calling it a "witch-hunting exercise".

On 15 May 2003, Chief Executive Tung Chee-hwa launched a government-led investigation, ordering the Secretary for Health, Welfare and Food to appoint a review committee comprising local and overseas experts. The membership of the SARS Expert Committee was announced on 28 May 2003. Committee co-chairs Sir Cyril Chantler and Sian Griffiths submitted the panel's final report to the government on 2 October 2003.

One of the recommendations in the report was the setting up of the Centre for Health Protection (CHP), to be charged with communicable disease control, surveillance, planning for epidemics, and co-ordination during outbreaks. This suggestion was welcomed by Hong Kong medical experts. Deputy health director Leung Pak-yin became the first controller of the CHP on 1 April 2004. The initial operations of the centre were supported by a HK$500 million donation from the Hong Kong Jockey Club. The centre officially commenced operation on 1 June 2004.

Structure
The centre has seven divisions:

 Communicable Disease Branch
 Emergency Response and Programme Management Branch
 Health Promotion Branch
 Infection Control Branch
 Non-communicable Disease Branch
 Public Health Laboratory Services Branch
 Public Health Services Branch

Controller 
The CHP is headed by the Controller for the Centre for Health Protection and reports to the Director of the Department of Health.

Functions
CHP deals with various health-related issues including:
 Emergency response
 Epidemiology
 Infection control
 Public health

See also
 List of national public health agencies

References

External links
 

2004 establishments in Hong Kong
Government agencies established in 2004
Government health agencies
Hong Kong government departments and agencies
Politics of Hong Kong
Public health organizations
National public health agencies